George Souza may refer to:

George Souza Jr. (born 1942), Hong Kong lawn and indoor bowler
George Souza Sr. (born 1919), Hong Kong lawn bowler